Devendra Goel (3 March 1919 – 26 February 1979) was an Indian film director and producer of Bollywood films and best known for his work in the 1950s and early 1960s.

He directed Aankhen on his debut. Devendra Goel also directed the Marathi film, Dost Asava Tar Asa with Ramesh Deo, Deven Varma and Padma Chavan. He directed the hit Ek Saal (1957) with Madhubala.

Filmography

Aankhen (1950)
Ada (1951)
Aas (1953)
Albeli (1955)
Vachan (1955): producer
Narsi Bhagat (1957)
Ek Saal (1957)
Chirag Kahan Roshni Kahan (1959)
Razia Sultana (1961)
Pyaar Ka Saagar (1961)
Door Ki Awaz (1964)
Dus Lakh (1966)
Ek Phool Do Mali (1969)
Dharkan (1972)
Ek Mahal Ho Sapno Ka (1975)
Aadmi Sadak Ka (1977)
Do Musafir (1978)
Dost Asava Tar Asa (Marathi Film)

External links
 

1919 births
1979 deaths
Hindi-language film directors
Film producers from Uttar Pradesh
People from Meerut
20th-century Indian film directors
Film directors from Uttar Pradesh